"I’m Falling" and "Cold Life" are songs by American Industrial band Ministry. Written by Al Jourgensen, these were first released in 1981 by Wax Trax! Records, as the band's debut single. Initially featuring "I'm Falling" as the A-side, the single found success via its B-side, "Cold Life", which was chosen as the A-side on release in the UK. In 1985, during Ministry's short-lived return on Wax Trax!, the single was reissued with "Cold Life" as the A-side.

Background and composition
“I’m Falling" is a synthpop song which bears influences from British post-punk acts such as The Sisters of Mercy and Killing Joke; in his 2013 autobiography, Ministry: The Lost Gospels..., Al Jourgensen admits that “I’m Falling” was influenced heavily by music of Joy Division and The Cure. Meanwhile, "Cold Life" bears influence of 1970's funk and soul acts, and was written about Jourgensen's experience living in a Chicago African-American neighborhood.

Initially, Jourgensen had recorded a demo tape of "I’m Falling" in his apartment, using a newly bought ARP Omni synthesizer, a drum machine, and a reel-to-reel tape recorder. At one occasion, Jourgensen had presented a demo to Jim Nash, the co-founder and co-owner of the independent record label Wax Trax! Records. Impressed by demo once listening to it, Nash had offered Jourgensen to record a single, as well as to form a touring band.

After assembling the first line-up of the band subsequently known as Ministry, Jourgensen went to Hedden West studios with co-producer Jay O'Roarke and an English-born engineer Iain Burgess, while Nash had paid for the band to record. For the recording, beside the core line-up of Jourgensen, keyboardists John Davis and Robert Roberts and drummer Stephen George, also approached were backing vocalist Steve Brighton, bassist Lamont Welton, and a horn player Preston Klik (also of Big Hat and The Book of Holy Lies); Jourgensen assumed an English accent for his vocals on "Cold Life", like he did on "I’m Falling". Nash and his Wax Trax! partner Danny Flesher liked both recorded songs, but requested Jourgensen to record one more track, an instrumental titled "Primental", for the single; Jourgensen states that "Primental" resembles some of music written for performances held by his then-girlfriend, Shannon Rose Riley.

Release 

“I’m Falling / Cold Life" single was initially released in late 1981. The first pressing featured a gray and peach packaging portraying Chicago Union Station, designed by Jim Nash and Brian Shanley; the later pressing featured the cover in a die-cut red and yellow motif, also designed by Nash and Shanley. Some time after, in March 1982, a British label Situation Two released the single in Europe with "Cold Life" as the A-side, as well as its extended dub version on the B-side. This release was packaged with a cover depicting four naked men, seemingly taking a sunbath.

The single, mainly its B-side "Cold Life", had achieved immediate success on both dancefloor and college radio in the US and the UK. By September 1982, "I’m Falling / Cold Life" reached number 5 on the charts of New York-based magazine Rockpool and peaked at number 45 on the Billboard Hot Dance/Disco chart with approximately 10,000 copies, and was later labelled the Wax Trax!' first hit.

"Cold Life" was featured on the band's 1987 compilation Twelve Inch Singles (1981–1984), with "I'm Falling" appearing on the compilation's 2014 re-release.

Critical reception
In review of 15 May 1982 Adam Sweeting of Melody Maker named "Cold Life" among the best singles of the week. He never heard Ministry before and was pleasantly surprised by "superfunk aggression".

Track listings

Chart positions

Accolades

Personnel
Credits adapted from liner notes of the single, as well as these of Twelve Inch Singles (1981–1984).

Release history

References

Notes

Citations

Bibliography

External links
 
 

1981 debut singles
Ministry (band) songs
1981 songs
Wax Trax! Records singles
Songs written by Al Jourgensen
Song recordings produced by Al Jourgensen